Captain Rugged is the sixth studio album by Nigerian musician Keziah Jones. It was released in January 2014 under Because Records.

Track listing

References

2014 albums
Keziah Jones albums